Evert Jan Bulder (24 December 1894 – 21 April 1973) was an association football player from the Netherlands, who represented his native country at the 1920 Summer Olympics in Antwerp, Belgium. There he won the bronze medal with the Netherlands national football team.

Club career
Bulder played on the left wing for hometown club Be Quick, playing his final match against Leeuwarden on 11 October 1931. He won the Dutch league title with Be Quick in 1920.

International career
He only earned one cap for the Netherlands, a September 1920 Olympic qualifier against Spain.

Personal life
Bulder was born in Groningen.  His younger brother Jaap (born  1896) was also a footballer and a member of the same Olympic squad.  Bulder died, aged 78, in Heerenveen.

References

External links
  Dutch Olympic Committee

1894 births
1973 deaths
Footballers from Groningen (city)
Association football wingers
Dutch footballers
Netherlands international footballers
Footballers at the 1920 Summer Olympics
Olympic footballers of the Netherlands
Olympic bronze medalists for the Netherlands
Medalists at the 1920 Summer Olympics
Olympic medalists in football
Be Quick 1887 players